Foros (Φάρος) is a resort town (an urban-type settlement, legally) in Yalta Municipality of the Autonomous Republic of Crimea, a territory of Ukraine and occupied by Russia under the name of ″Republic of Crimea″. Population:  

Foros is the southernmost resort in Crimea and in all of Ukraine.

The settlement was founded and named by medieval Greek merchants. It was rediscovered in the late 19th century by Alexander Kuznetsov, a Russian "tea king" who had his palace built on the sea shore. It was Kuznetsov who commissioned the town's main landmark, the Resurrection Church. This ornate five-domed architectural extravaganza is sited on a 400-metre cliff overlooking Foros.

The Soviet leaders had several state dachas built near Foros. One of these came to international attention during the 1991 Soviet coup d'état attempt, when the Soviet leader Mikhail Gorbachev had been vacationing at the time of the coup. Gorbachev's luxury dacha had been fired upon a couple of times during the capture, after which Gorbachev was placed under house arrest.

See also
 Baydar Gate
 Church of the Resurrection, Foros

References

External links
 Санатории Форос - 
 

Urban-type settlements in Crimea
Seaside resorts in Russia
Seaside resorts in Ukraine
Yalta Municipality
Populated places of the Byzantine Empire